Megalopyge lanata is a moth of the family Megalopygidae. It was described by Caspar Stoll in 1780.

References

External links
 Matías N. Sánchez et al.: Understanding toxicological implications of accidents with caterpillars Megalopyge lanata and Podalia orsilochus (Lepidoptera: Megalopygidae). In: Comparative Biochemistry and Physiology Part C: Toxicology & Pharmacology; Volume 216, February 2019, Pages 110-119; doi:10.1016/j.cbpc.2018.11.011

Moths described in 1780
Megalopygidae